Pyathon is a village in Taungdwin Region, Minkin Township, Kale District, Sagaing Division in Myanmar.

References

External links
Maplandia World Gazetteer

Mingin Township
Populated places in Kale District